The Jacoby Open Swiss Teams national bridge championship is held at the spring American Contract Bridge League (ACBL) North American Bridge Championship (NABC).

The Jacoby Open Swiss Teams is a four session Swiss Teams event with two qualifying and two final sessions. The event typically starts on the second Saturday of the NABC. The event is open.

History
The Jacoby Open Swiss Teams is a four-session event --- consisting of two qualifying sessions and two final sessions—with the Jacoby Trophy going to the winners.

The event began in 1982 and was then named the North American Men's Swiss Teams. In 1990, it was changed to become the Open Swiss with the Jacoby Trophy awarded to the winners.

The trophy is named for Oswald and Jim Jacoby --- one of the premier father-son pairs in ACBL history, the first father-son to win a national championship together and the first father-son to be elected to the ACBL Bridge Hall of Fame.

The senior Jacoby, Oswald Jacoby, (1902–1984) won his first major title --- the National Team Championship of the American Whist League --- in 1929 and his last major title --- the Reisinger Board-a-Match Teams --- in 1983.

In between, he won the McKenney Trophy (now the Barry Crane Top 500) four times. He was the first player to win 1,000 masterpoints in a single year and the first player to earn 10,000 masterpoints.

Jacoby won seven Spingolds, seven Vanderbilts, two Reisingers and more than a dozen other major titles. He was named to the ACBL Bridge Hall of Fame in 1965.

He and son Jim are the co-authors of Jacoby Transfer Bids, Jacoby 2NT and other bidding ideas. Together, they won the Reisinger in 1955 --- when Jim was 22 --- and the Vanderbilt in 1965.
Jim Jacoby (1933–1991), elected to the Hall of Fame in 1997, won the Bermuda Bowl in 1970 and 1971, the World Mixed Teams in 1972 and the World Team Olympiad in 1988. He won more than 14 NABC titles and captured the Barry Crane Top 500 in 1988 --- the same year he won the Olympiad title.

He is one of only three players to win the masterpoint title and a world championship in the same year --- Charles Goren won the Bermuda Bowl and the McKenney in 1950 while Barry Crane won the World Mixed Pairs and the McKenney in 1978.

Winners

Sources

List of previous winners, Page 11

2009 winners, Page 1

External links
ACBL official website

North American Bridge Championships